Handley's tailless bat (Anoura cultrata) is a species of bat in the family Phyllostomidae. It is found in Bolivia, Colombia, Costa Rica, Ecuador, Panama, Peru, and Venezuela.

References

Anoura
Mammals of Colombia
Bats of Central America
Mammals described in 1960
Taxonomy articles created by Polbot